The Australian National Handball Championship consists of four different tournaments across various age groups, including a Junior Section, Schools Tournament, and Australian University Games. In 2016, the Championship ran from 31 August until 9 October.

The Junior Section was the first tournament ever in the Championship. It ran from 29 July to 31 July, and was held at Runaway Bay on the Gold Coast in Queensland. Teams from New South Wales, Queensland, the Australian Capital Territory, and Wellington, New Zealand all took part in the tournament.

The Schools Tournament was the second tournament in the championship. It was held in Canberra and ran from 31 August to 2 September. This was the first Schools tournament held since the late 1980s. Turramurra High School won both the girls and boys tournament. Other schools competing included Narrabundah College, Canberra Combined Schools, and Cheltenham Secondary College. This tournament replaced the Youth Nationals.

The Australian University Games was the third tournament in the championship. It was held in Perth, Western Australia. Division One was won by Deakin University, beating the Queensland University of Technology. The University of Technology Sydney took the bronze medal. In Division Two, Griffith University beat the University of Canberra, with Flinders University taking the bronze medal.

The Senior Tournament was the fourth tournament in the championship. It was held in Sydney from the 6th to 9 October 2016. The winners of the men's section were South Australia, who defeated hosts New South Wales. Victoria won the women's section, defeating Queensland.

Senior Indoor results

Men

Final

3rd/4th play-off

5th/6th play-off

Women

Final

3rd/4th play-off

5th/6th play-off

Junior Indoor Results

Under 21 Men's

Final

 Third placed team – New South Wales

Under 21 Women's

Final

 Third placed team – New South Wales

Under 18 Boys

 Third placed team – Queensland

Under 18 Girls

Schools Championship

Boys

Girls

University Games

Mixed Division 1

Gold Medal playoff

Bronze Medal playoff

Final ranking

Mixed Division 2

Gold Medal playoff

Bronze Medal playoff

Final ranking

References

External links
 Handball Australia webpage
 Handball New South Wales webpage
 Australian handball wants to capitalise on the game's Olympic popularity. ABC News. 4 August 2016

2016 in Australian sport
Handball competitions in Australia
2016 in handball